Andreafsky Wilderness is a wilderness area in the U.S. state of Alaska.

History
Andreafsky Wilderness is designated by the United States Congress now it contains a total area of 1,300,000 acres and managed by Fish & Wildlife service. The Andreafsky River and its East Fork, in the northern section, flow southwest along parallel paths and drain into the Yukon River.

References

External links
Recreation.gov - Andreafsky Wilderness

Protected areas of Nome Census Area, Alaska
Protected areas of Kusilvak Census Area, Alaska
Wilderness areas of Alaska